An alliance is usually an agreement between two or more parties, made in order to advance common goals and to secure common interests. It can also mean that there is an affinity or similarity.

Alliance, Alliances or The Alliance may also refer to:

Places

United States
Alliance, California, a former unincorporated community
Alliance, Indiana, an unincorporated town
Alliance, Nebraska, a city
Alliance, North Carolina, a town
Alliance, Ohio, a city
Alliance station, Amtrak station
Alliance, Texas, a master planned community
Alliance Township, Clay County, Minnesota

Elsewhere
Alliance, Alberta, Canada, a village
Alliance, Suriname, a town

In politics
Electoral alliance, an association of political parties or individuals that exists solely to stand in elections
Canadian Alliance, a defunct political party
Alliance (Chile), a coalition of right-wing parties
Alliance Party (Fiji), the ruling party in Fiji from 1966 to 1987, now dissolved
The Alliance for Workers' Liberty, a Third Camp Trotskyist organisation in Britain
The Alliance (France), a centrist, liberal, ecologist, and social-liberal coalition from 2011 to 2012
The Alliance (Hong Kong)
Alliance Party (Malaysia), a coalition from 1953 to 1975
Alliance (New Zealand political party), a left-wing party
Alliance Party of Northern Ireland
Alliance (Poland), a party
Alliance (Portugal), a party
Alliance (Saint Martin), a party
Alliance (Slovak political party), a party
Alliance (Sweden), an alliance of four centre-right parties in the Riksdag
SDP–Liberal Alliance, an alliance of the Social Democratic Party and the Liberal Party

Businesses
 Alliance Films, a Canadian former motion picture distribution/production company
 Alliance Game Distributors, a North American distributor of RPGs, board-games and card games
 Alliance Group, a New Zealand sheep meat producer based in Invercargill
 Alliance Healthcare, a European wholesaler, distributor and retailer of pharmaceutical, surgical, medical and healthcare products
 Alliance Tire Company, a tire manufacturing company based in Hadera, Israel
 Alliance Trust plc, a publicly traded investment and financial services company headquartered in Dundee, Scotland

Aviation 

 Airline alliance A group of airlines that work together cooperatively
 Alliance Air (India), former name of Air India Regional, an airline
 Alliance Air (Uganda), an airline from 1995 to 2000
 Alliance Airlines, an Australian charter airline

Ships
HMS Alliance, three ships
USS Alliance, two ships
 NRV Alliance, a research vessel of the Centre for Maritime Research and Experimentation

Automobiles
Alliance (1904 automobile), an early German automobile
Alliance (1905 automobile), an early French automobile
Renault Alliance, a subcompact manufactured from 1983 to 1987 for North America

In arts and entertainment

Alliance
 Alliance, a nation in the science fiction Alliance–Union universe of C. J. Cherryh
Alliance, a 1990 science fiction novel by Jerry Oltion in the Isaac Asimov's Robots and Aliens series
 The Alliance, nickname for the Media, Entertainment and Arts Alliance, Australian professional association
The Alliance (dancehall), a group of dancehall artists founded by Bounty Killer
Alliance (DC Comics), a fictional organization of alien freedom fighters
 Alliance (esports), a Swedish esports organization
Alliance (Firefly), a fictional government in the Serenity franchise
 The Alliance of American Football, a professional American football league
Alliance (sculpture), in the centre of Cardiff, Wales
"The Alliance" (The Office episode)
Alliance Theatre, a theater company in Atlanta, Georgia
The Alliance (Warcraft), an alliance in World of Warcraft

Alliances
Alliances, an expansion for the trading card game Magic: The Gathering from the Ice Age block
 "Alliances" (Star Trek: Voyager), a 1996 episode in the TV series Star Trek: Voyager
 Alliances (novel), a Dragonlance book by Paul B. Thompson and Tonya C. Cook
 Alliances (The Wire), a 2006 episode of The Wire 
 Stargate SG-1: Alliances, a 2006 novel by Karen Miller

Schools
Alliance University, Bangalore, India, a private university established in 2010
Alliance College, Cambridge Springs, Pennsylvania, an independent, liberal arts college which closed in 1987
Alliance High School (disambiguation)

Sport
Alliance (basketball), a Central Basketball League based in Alliance, Ohio, for the 1908–09 season
Alliance Jiu Jitsu, Brazilian jiu-jitsu association
Alliance Sport Alsace, French basketball team
The Alliance (professional wrestling), a professional wrestling faction

Other uses
Alliance (phytosociology), a unit of vegetation in phytosociology
Alliance Pipeline, a Canadian natural gas pipeline
Alliance (taxonomy), an informal taxonomic grouping of species or genera that have at some time been considered similar
David Alliance, Baron Alliance (born 1932), British businessman and Liberal Democrat politician
Alliance United, a Canadian soccer team

See also

Alliance coupler
Alianza (disambiguation)
Alliance Party (disambiguation)
Northern Alliance (disambiguation)
Unholy Alliance (disambiguation)
Confederacy (disambiguation)
Coalition (disambiguation)